Yvonne Mabille (born 4 August 1913, date of death unknown) was a French sprinter. She competed in the women's 100 metres at the 1936 Summer Olympics.

References

External links
 

1913 births
Year of death missing
Athletes (track and field) at the 1936 Summer Olympics
French female sprinters
Olympic athletes of France
Place of birth missing
Olympic female sprinters